Fake snow is any product which simulates the appearance and texture of snow, without being made from frozen crystalline water.

Fake snow has been made from many materials.  In the early 1900s decorative snow was sometimes made from borax flakes and even ammonia. 

Before the dangers of asbestos were known, the substance was sold for Christmas tree decoration. It was also used to simulate snow in films, including The Wizard of Oz and Citizen Kane. 

Fake snow has also been sold in spray cans which could apply the flocking to windows and indoor displays.

Film and theatre

When snow-like scenery is needed in live theatre, materials have included feathers, cotton, paper, breakfast cereal and potato flakes. To reduce the cleanup problem, many theatres use "snow generators" which create soapy white bubbles which disappear after a short time.  A similar process has been used in film studios and backlots; one well-known example is It's a Wonderful Life.

For outdoor film scenes needing large amounts of fake snow, salt was an inexpensive choice, but damaging to soil and plant life. Gypsum and bleached or painted cereal flakes have often been used; a less noisy alternative is paper, which is shredded and spread by specially-built machines.

Newer technology has created biodegradable, eco-friendly fake snow made of food grade ingredients that dissolve in the rain without leaving residue. Cellulose and other types leave harmful residue when they get wet.

References

Special effects
Christmas decorations